Iota Draconis b, formally named Hypatia (pronounced  or ), is an exoplanet orbiting the K-type giant star Iota Draconis about 101.2 light-years (31 parsecs, or nearly  km) from Earth in the constellation Draco. The exoplanet was found by using the radial velocity method, from radial-velocity measurements via observation of Doppler shifts in the spectrum of the planet's parent star. It was the first planet discovered orbiting a giant star.

Physical characteristics

Mass, radius and temperature
Iota Draconis b is a "super-Jupiter", a planet that has mass larger than that of the gas giants Jupiter and Saturn. It has an estimated minimum mass of around 11.82  and a potential radius of around 12  based on its mass, since it is more massive than Jupiter.

In 2021, astrometric observations revealed the true mass of Iota Draconis b to be 16.4 .

Host star

The planet orbits a (K-type) giant star named Iota Draconis. The star has exhausted the hydrogen supply in its core and is currently fusing helium. The star has a mass of 1.82  and a radius of around 12 . It has a surface temperature of 4545 K and is around 800 million years old based on its evolution. Although much younger than the Sun, the higher mass of this star correlates to a faster evolution, leading to the host star having already departed from the main sequence. When on the main sequence, Iota Draconis was probably a Class A star with surface temperature between 7,400 and 10,000K. In comparison, the Sun is about 4.6 billion years old and has a surface temperature of 5778 K.

The star's apparent magnitude, a measure of how bright it appears from Earth, is 3.31. Therefore, Iota Draconis can be seen with the naked eye.

Orbit 

Iota Draconis b orbits its star with nearly 55 times the Sun's luminosity (55 ) every 511 days at an average distance of 1.275 AU (compared to Mars' orbital distance from the Sun, which is 1.52 AU) It has a very eccentric orbit, with an eccentricity of 0.7124.

Discovery 
Discovered in 2002 during a radial velocity study of K-class giant stars, its eccentric orbit aided its detection, as giant stars have pulsations which can mimic the presence of a planet.

Name
Following its discovery the planet was designated Iota Draconis b. In July 2014 the International Astronomical Union launched NameExoWorlds, a process for giving proper names to certain exoplanets and their host stars. The process involved public nomination and voting for the new names. In December 2015, the IAU announced that the winning name for this planet was Hypatia. The winning name was submitted by Hypatia, a student society of the Physics Faculty of the Universidad Complutense de Madrid, Spain. Hypatia was a famous Greek astronomer, mathematician, and philosopher.

References

External links
SolStation: Edasich/Iota Draconis

Draco (constellation)
Giant planets
Exoplanets discovered in 2002
Exoplanets detected by radial velocity
Exoplanets detected by astrometry
Exoplanets with proper names